Hilton Falls Conservation Area located in Campbellville, Ontario on the Niagara Escarpment is a conservation area known for its ten-metre waterfall, hiking trails and small glacial pothole. It constitutes  and offers mountain biking as well as cross-country skiing. It is owned and operated by Conservation Halton. The Bruce Trail runs through the area.

References

External links

 

Conservation areas in Ontario
Protected areas of the Regional Municipality of Halton